Mount William may refer to:

 Mount William (Antarctica)
 Mount William (Mount Duwil), in the Grampians National Park, Victoria, Australia
 Mount William (Queensland), the summit of the Clarke Range in North Queensland, Australia
 Mount William stone axe quarry, near Lancefield, Victoria, Australia 
 Mount William National Park, Tasmania, Australia 
 Mount William, Tasmania, a locality in Australia
 Mount William, a sub-hill in the Battle of Mount Tumbledown of the Falklands War